Granton may refer to:

Places
Australia
 Granton, Tasmania

Canada
 Granton, Nova Scotia
 Granton, Ontario, a village part of the Lucan Biddulph township

Scotland
 Granton, Edinburgh

United States
 Granton, Wisconsin

Other uses
 A "granton edge", a type of edge detailing on a kitchen knife

See also 
 Grantown-on-Spey, a town in Scotland